Tracks, or Trackslistan, was a top 20 song list and a program of the Swedish Radio channel SR P3. The program premiered on 8 September  1984, and was broadcast on Saturday afternoons. The listeners voted for the songs they think is the best. Track list was one of the top music charts in Sweden. The predecessor of the Tracks was "Poporama" and was broadcast between 1974 and 1984. The host for the show was Kaj Kindvall. The chart was discontinued in 2010.
The three most popular artists on the chart were Kent, Madonna and Roxette.

Trackslistan on television
"Trackslistan" was broadcast for three seasons in the mid-2000s by SVT. There were different hosts during the seasons. In 2005, Gonzalo Del Rio was the host. An artist or a band were invited every week to perform their current song.

References

External links
Trackslistan

Sveriges Radio programmes
1984 radio programme debuts
2011 radio programme endings
1984 establishments in Sweden
2011 disestablishments in Sweden